Lake Mary is a suburban city that is located in the Greater Orlando metropolitan area in Seminole County, Florida, United States, and is located in Central Florida. The population was 13,822 at the 2010 census.

History

Lake Mary was named after Mary Sundell, the wife of Reverend J.F. Sundell, who settled on the northern shores of the lake. Lake Mary started as a village of two tiny settlements called Bent’s Station (located on the north shore of Crystal Lake) and Belle Fontaine. They were located along the South Florida Railroad which ran between Sanford and Orlando. The area was an agricultural community and early  settlers  included  lumbermen,  turpentine  workers,  families  from  Fort  Reed  (Sanford)  who  had  received  land  grants,  and  Swedish  families, who were mainly orange growers. By the time the area became known as Lake Mary, it was developed by a tight-rope walker and chemist named Frank Evans, who settled in the area in 1882. The first Lake Mary Post Office was established in February 1887. Evans built the original Lake Mary Elementary School, along with many commercial buildings and new homes. In 1923, he founded the Chamber of Commerce and he became a Seminole County Commissioner in 1926. The Lake Mary city hall building was created in 1946. The city incorporated in August 1973. Rated by Money magazine as the #4 best place to live in America in the August 2007 issue.  It currently has a history museum in the Lake Mary Chamber of Commerce Building.

Geography

Demographics

Lake Mary is part of the Orlando–Kissimmee–Sanford Metropolitan Statistical Area, and is approximately 19 miles from Orlando, Florida.

As of the 2000 census, there were 11,458 people, 4,199 households, and 3,271 families residing in the city. The racial makeup of the city was 89.33% White, 3.60% African American, 0.24% Native American, 3.83% Asian, 0.09% Pacific Islander, 1.47% from other races, and 1.42% from two or more races. Hispanic or Latino of any race were 6.22% of the population.

There were 4,199 households, out of which 38.4% had children under the age of 18 living with them, 70.8% were married couples living together, 6.5% had a female householder with no husband present, and 22.1% were non-families. 16.9% of all households were made up of individuals, and 5.8% had someone living alone who was 65 years of age or older.  The average household size was 2.72 and the average family size was 3.08.

In the city, the population was spread out, with 26.7% under the age of 18, 5.4% from 18 to 24, 31.9% from 25 to 44, 25.9% from 45 to 64, and 10.2% who were 65 years of age or older.  The median age was 38 years. For every 100 females, there were 96.9 males.  For every 100 females age 18 and over, there were 94.8 males.

The median income for a household in the city was $83,921, and the median income for a family was $96,983. Males had a median income of $57,132 versus $32,439 for females. The per capita income for the city was $31,094.  2.9% of the population and 2.5% of families were below the poverty line.   1.8% of those under the age of 18 and 3.6% of those 65 and older were living below the poverty line.

Education

Seminole County Public Schools operates Lake Mary's public schools.

There are 7 public schools, 5 private schools, 1 State college (Seminole State College of Florida), and 1 library in the greater Lake Mary area.

Elementary schools

Heathrow Elementary School
Crystal Lake Elementary School
Lake Mary Elementary School

Middle schools

Markham Woods Middle School
Greenwood Lakes Middle School

High schools

 Lake Mary High School

Business and industry

The American Automobile Association, AAA, National Office is located in Lake Mary and is one of the largest business employers in the area. Also located in Lake Mary is the new Verizon Financial Center, Mitsubishi-Hitachi Power Systems along with multiple other nationally known companies. On a smaller scale, Scholastic Book Fairs, the book fair division of Scholastic Corporation, is headquartered in Lake Mary. In addition, the Orlando TV stations WTGL as well as WOFL and sister station WRBW (by way of Fox Television Stations) have studios located in Lake Mary. All of these are visible along Interstate 4. Prior to Emmis Communications selling WKCF to Hearst-Argyle (now Hearst Television), WKCF's studios were located in the studios that is now the studios of WTGL, before moving with now-sister station WESH in Winter Park.

Dixon Ticonderoga, one of the world's largest producers of pencils and art supplies, has put its headquarters in Lake Mary.  Accesso, an English technology firm involved in the leisure industry, has its North American headquarters in Lake Mary, employing 220 people locally as of 2018.

Top employers

According to the City's 2021 Comprehensive Annual Financial Report, the top employers in the city are:

Notable people

 Lee Corso, sports broadcaster and football analyst for ESPN
 Chris DiMarco, professional golfer in PGA
 Gigi Fernández, professional Puerto Rican tennis player who has played at Wimbledon, Olympics and the U.S. Open
 Rowdy Gaines, Olympic gold medal winner and NBC swimming analyst
 Jesse Palmer, University of Florida quarterback, New York Giants quarterback
 Aubrey Peeples, actress and singer
 Keith Rivers, All-American linebacker for USC Trojans, 2004–2007; linebacker for the Giants in the NFL
 Toni Tennille, Grammy Award winner, singer, songwriter, author
 Stan Van Gundy, head coach of Orlando Magic (2007–2012), Detroit Pistons
 Rickie Weeks, professional baseball player for Milwaukee Brewers

See also

 Lake Mary (SunRail station)

References

External links

 Official site

Cities in Seminole County, Florida
Greater Orlando
Cities in Florida